Dehydrogenase/reductase (SDR family) member 7 is a protein that in humans is encoded by the DHRS7 gene.

Function 

Short-chain dehydrogenases/reductases (SDRs), such as DHRS7, catalyze the oxidation/reduction of a wide range of substrates, including retinoids and steroids.

References

Further reading 

 
 
 
 
 
 
 

Human proteins